Mory Bamba (born 1 June 2002) is an Ivorian professional football player who plays for Italian Serie D club Livorno .

Club career 
Mory Bamba joined Italian club Roma in 2015, from the Vigor Perconti, a small club from the Italian capital, located in the Collatino quarter of Rome.

He made his professional debut for Roma on the 10 December 2020 in a Europa League game against CSKA Sofia. He then became Roma's youngest foreign-born player to play in any European competition.

References

External links

2002 births
Living people
Ivorian footballers
Ivory Coast under-20 international footballers
Association football forwards
People from Bondoukou
A.S. Roma players
Leixões S.C. players
U.S. Livorno 1915 players
Liga Portugal 2 players
Serie D players
Ivorian expatriate footballers
Expatriate footballers in Italy
Ivorian expatriate sportspeople in Italy
Expatriate footballers in Portugal
Ivorian expatriate sportspeople in Portugal